Houstonia sharpii, the Hidalgo bluet, is a plant species in the family Rubiaceae. It is a herbaceous perennial up to 30 cm tall, spreading by means of stolons spreading along the surface of the ground. It  also has white flowers. It is native to the states of Hidalgo, Puebla and Veracruz in Mexico.

References 

sharpii
Endemic flora of Mexico
Flora of Hidalgo (state)
Flora of Puebla
Flora of Veracruz
Plants described in 1980